Maximiliano Teodoro Iglesias Acevedo (born 6 February 1991), better known as Maxi Iglesias, is a Spanish actor, model, and television presenter.

Career
Iglesias was born on 6 February, 1991, in Madrid, where he studied at the Colegio Cardenal Spínola.

He started his career in 2005 in Hospital Central (Telecinco), then in Cuéntame cómo pasó and Amar en tiempos revueltos (La 1), Toledo, cruce de destinos and Los protegidos (Antena 3), and professionally shot to fame thanks to his performance as César Cabano in Física o química (Antena 3). He is starring as Frank Farmer in the Spanish production of the musical The Bodyguard. Also during 2020-2021 he is a part of a famous Netflix show Valeria.

Filmography

Film

Television

References

External links 
 
 
 

1991 births
20th-century Spanish male actors
21st-century Spanish male actors
Living people
Male actors from Madrid
Spanish male film actors
Spanish male models
Spanish male telenovela actors
Spanish male television actors